In Inuit mythology, Nootaikok was a god who presided over icebergs and glaciers.

Inuit gods
Water gods